Dutti may refer to:

Massimo Dutti, Spanish fabrics and clothing company
Sunil Dutti (born 1960), Indian politician and a member of Indian National Congress